Rockapella (sometimes referred to as Devilbaby because of the image of a devil-costumed baby doll on its cover) is the eighth overall and third North American studio album by the a cappella group Rockapella. It contains mostly very-updated versions of previously recorded material following a membership change. The album was independently released from 1997 to 1998 until it was licensed by J-Bird Records in 1998 and released in 1999 as Don't Tell Me You Do with additional tracks and minus "Bed of Nails". Rockapella is the first album on which tenor Kevin Wright can be heard.

Track listing

Personnel
Scott Leonard – high tenor
Kevin Wright – tenor
Elliott Kerman – baritone
Barry Carl – bass
Jeff Thacher – vocal percussion

1997 albums
Rockapella albums